A French curve is a template usually made from metal, wood or plastic composed of many different segments of the Euler spiral (aka the clothoid curve). It is used in manual drafting and in fashion design to draw smooth curves of varying radii.  The curve is placed on the drawing material, and a pencil, knife or other implement is traced around its curves to produce the desired result. They were invented by the German mathematician Ludwig Burmester and are also known as Burmester (curve) set.

Clothing design 

French curve physical templates are regularly used for original high fashion design and by home sewists (along with other types of artisans) most usefully in necklines, sleeve, bust and waist variations. The varied curve radii allow for smooth and stylish personalized adjustments of standard purchased clothing patterns for an excellent, personalized fit. Fashion designers and sewists may use a selection of french curves, hip curves, straight edges and L-shaped right angle rulers. They may be in metal or clear plastics, with measurements marked in metric or imperial.

Digital versions 
As modern computer-aided design (CAD) systems use vector-based graphics to achieve a precise radius, or approximate curves, mechanical templates (and most mechanical drawing techniques) have become obsolete outside of stitchers' home pattern adjustments and fashion designs.  Manual curve templates are also used by model makers and others maintaining traditional trades and skills. Digital computers can also be used to generate a set of coordinates that accurately describe an arbitrary curve, and the points can be connected with line segments to approximate the curve with a degree of accuracy, although this varies with the type of curve.  Some computer-graphics systems make use of Bézier curves, which allow a curve to be bent in real time on a display screen to follow a set of coordinates that are not on the line being drawn. This is different from the way a French curve is placed on a set of three or four points on paper.

See also

References

External links
 Weisstein, Eric W. French Curve from MathWorld.
 Use of the French Curve from Integrated Publishing.

Technical drawing tools
Curves
Mathematical tools